Just Heroes is a 1989 Hong Kong crime film, directed by John Woo and Wu Ma. The film stars Danny Lee, David Chiang and Stephen Chow.

Plot 
Following the death of a triad leader, there is conflict within the Hong Kong organised crime syndicate as various possible leaders vie for power. Pak Wai attempts to bring the traitor in the midst of his own group to justice following a taped conversation of traitor admitting his crimes, but who cannot be found, while Sou, the elected leader of the triad has his family attacked as he fights unknown enemies to bring the organisation back under control. Their actions are hindered by Jacky who is attempting to build up anger between the two completing triads of Hong Kong. The film is brought to a bloody conclusion as the traitor leader of the group storms the triad safe house in a desperate attempt to gain control over the group, but is met by heavy resistance.

Cast
David Chiang as Cheung Pak Wai
Danny Lee as Sou
Chen Kuan Tai as Tai
Tien Niu as Annie, Sou's wife
Cally Kwong as Tai's wife
Wu Ma as Ma
James Wong as Solicitor Wong
Stephen Chow as 'Jacky' Yuen Kei-hao
Shing Fui-On as Wah
Nie Jun
Ti Lung as Loon
Yueh Hua as Mr.Elliot

Production 
Just Heroes began production as a benefit for the Hong Kong Director's Union. The film was made to aid director Chang Cheh who was broke. When actors Danny Lee and David Chiang found out about Chang's financial situation, they developed the story Just Heroes that was made to be similar to the film A Better Tomorrow. John Woo directed about 60% of the film.

Release 
Just Heroes was released on 14 September 1989. The film was not a major financial success in Hong Kong, making HK$7,913,229 and coming in 48th place in the year end box office. All the money from the film was given to Chang Cheh so he could retire. Rather than using it as retirement funds, Chang used the money to direct another film.

Notes

References

External links
 
 
 Just Heroes at Hong Kong Cinemagic
 
 

1989 films
Hong Kong crime drama films
1980s Cantonese-language films
1989 crime drama films
Triad films
Gun fu films
Films set in Hong Kong
Films directed by John Woo
Films directed by Wu Ma
1980s Hong Kong films